Jackalope is a mythical animal and a cross between a jackrabbit and an antelope, goat or deer.

Jackalope may refer to:

Music 
Jackalope, a band of contemporary Native American music artists headed by Tucson-based R. Carlos Nakai
Jakalope, a Canadian band
"Jackalope", a song by Colonel Claypool's Bucket of Bernie Brains from the album The Big Eyeball in the Sky
"Jackalope", a song by Shonen Knife from the album Happy Hour

Computing 
Jaunty Jackalope, version 9.04 of Ubuntu released in April 2009 
Jackalope is an open source PHP implementation of the JCR API

Sports 
Odessa Jackalopes, a junior hockey team in the NAHL
Odessa Jackalopes (1997–2011), a minor league hockey team in the CHL

Other 
The Jackalope a 2003 short film starring Leighton Meester
Jackalope Brewing Company, a brewery located in Nashville, Tennessee